Mironave was a  cargo ship that was built as a passenger ship in 1938 by Schiffbau-Gesellschaft Unterweser AG, Wesermünde, Germany for German owners. In 1940, she was requisitioned by the Kriegsmarine. Seized by the Allies in 1945, she was passed to the Ministry of War Transport (MoWT) and renamed Empire Concave. In 1946, she was passed to the Norwegian Government and renamed Galtnes. She was sold into merchant service in 1947 and renamed Ila. In 1952, she was sold to Brazil and was renamed São Leopoldo. In 1965, a further sale saw her renamed Mironave. She was still in active service in 1982, when a further sale took place.

Description
The ship was built in 1938 by Schiffbau-Gesellschaft Unterweser AG, Wesermünde.

She had a gross register tonnage of 1,125 and a net register tonnage of 571.

The ship was propelled by a 4-stroke single-cycle double-acting diesel engine, which had 12 cylinders of  diameter by  stroke. The engine was built by Maschinenfabriek Augsburg-Nürnberg AG, Augsburg. It drove twin screw propellers.

History
Luna was built for Dampfschiffahrts Gesellschaft Neptun AG (Neptun Line). She had a passenger certificate. Her port of registry was Bremen and the Code Letters DOUV were allocated. In 1940, Luna was requisitioned by the Kriegsmarine. In 1942, she is recorded as no longer holding a passenger certificate. She was seized by the Allies at Eckernförde in May 1945 and passed to the MoWT, renamed Empire Concave. Her port of registry was changed to London. The Code Letters GFKM and United Kingdom Official Number 180650 were allocated. In 1946, Empire Concave was allocated to Norway, and passed to the Norwegian Government. She was renamed Galtnes. In 1947, she was sold to Per T Lykke, Trondheim and renamed Ila. In 1952, she was sold to L Figueiredo Navegação, Brazil and renamed São Leopoldo. She was sold to Casimiro Filho Industria Comercio in 1965 and renamed Mironave. In 1982, she was sold to Petrosul.

References

1938 ships
Ships built in Bremen (state)
Passenger ships of Germany
Auxiliary ships of the Kriegsmarine
Ministry of War Transport ships
Empire ships
Merchant ships of the United Kingdom
Merchant ships of Norway
Merchant ships of Brazil